Raymond Choo Kong (1949–2019) was a Trinidad and Tobago actor, stage director and producer. He received 18 Cacique Awards for his stage adaptations over the course of 20 years. He was found dead from multiple stab wounds in his home in Arima on July 15, 2019 due to an apparent home invasion and robbery. Choo Kong's funeral took place on July 24, 2019 at the Santa Rosa Roman Catholic Church, Woodford St, Arima.

Choo Kong was openly gay.

References

1949 births
2019 deaths
21st-century Trinidad and Tobago actors
20th-century Trinidad and Tobago actors
Gay actors
Trinidad and Tobago people of Chinese descent
Trinidad and Tobago LGBT rights activists
LGBT theatre directors
LGBT theatre managers and producers
People murdered in Trinidad and Tobago
21st-century Trinidad and Tobago male actors
20th-century Trinidad and Tobago male actors